Greenwich is an unincorporated community in northeastern Piute County, Utah, United States, just east of the Fishlake National Forest.  It lies along State Route 62 northeast of the town of Junction, the county seat of Piute County.  Its elevation is 6,854 feet (2,089 m).  Although Greenwich is unincorporated, it has a post office, with the ZIP code of 84732. Greenwich is said to be an anglicized form of a Native American name.

Climate
This climatic region is typified by large seasonal temperature differences, with warm to hot (and often humid) summers and cold (sometimes severely cold) winters.  According to the Köppen Climate Classification system, Greenwich has a humid continental climate, abbreviated "Dfb" on climate maps.

See also

References

External links

Unincorporated communities in Piute County, Utah
Unincorporated communities in Utah